The UEFA Women's Euro 2022 qualifying competition was a women's football competition that determined the 15 teams joining the automatically qualified hosts England in the UEFA Women's Euro 2022 final tournament.

Apart from England, 47 of the remaining 54 UEFA member national teams entered the qualifying competition, including Cyprus which entered for the first time at senior women's level, and Kosovo which entered their first Women's Euro.

Format
Different from previous qualifying competitions, the preliminary round was abolished and all entrants started from the qualifying group stage. The qualifying competition consisted of two rounds:
Qualifying group stage: The 47 teams were drawn into nine groups: two groups of six teams and seven groups of five teams. Each group was played in home-and-away round-robin format. The nine group winners and the three best runners-up (not counting results against the sixth-placed team) qualified directly for the final tournament, while the remaining six runners-up advanced to the play-offs.
Play-offs: The six teams were drawn into three ties to play home-and-away two-legged matches to determine the last three qualified teams.

Tiebreakers
In the qualifying group stage, teams were ranked according to points (3 points for a win, 1 point for a draw, 0 points for a loss), and if tied on points, the following tiebreaking criteria were applied, in the order given, to determine the rankings (Regulations Article 14.01):
Points in head-to-head matches among tied teams;
Goal difference in head-to-head matches among tied teams;
Goals scored in head-to-head matches among tied teams;
Away goals scored in head-to-head matches among tied teams;
If more than two teams are tied, and after applying all head-to-head criteria above, a subset of teams are still tied, all head-to-head criteria above are reapplied exclusively to this subset of teams;
Goal difference in all group matches;
Goals scored in all group matches;
Away goals scored in all group matches;
Wins in all group matches;
Away wins in all group matches;
Disciplinary points (red card = 3 points, yellow card = 1 point, expulsion for two yellow cards in one match = 3 points);
UEFA coefficient ranking for the qualifying group stage draw.

To determine the three best runners-up from the qualifying group stage, the results against the teams in sixth place were discarded. The following criteria were applied (Regulations Article 14.02):
Points;
Goal difference;
Goals scored;
Away goals scored;
Wins;
Away wins;
Disciplinary points;
UEFA coefficient ranking for the qualifying group stage draw.

In the play-offs, the team that scored more goals on aggregate over the two legs qualified for the final tournament. If the aggregate score was level, the away goals rule was applied, i.e., the team that scored more goals away from home over the two legs advanced. If away goals were also equal, extra time was played. The away goals rule was again applied after extra time, i.e., if there were goals scored during extra time and the aggregate score was still level, the visiting team advancesd by virtue of more away goals scored. If no goals were scored during extra time, the tie was decided by penalty shoot-out (Regulations Article 19.01).

Effects of the COVID-19 pandemic
Due to the COVID-19 pandemic in Europe, the UEFA Executive Committee approved on 28 August 2020 the following principles for the qualifying phase of UEFA Women's Euro 2022:
If a team cannot field the minimum required number of players (at least 13 players including at least one goalkeeper) due to positive SARS-2 coronavirus tests and the match cannot be rescheduled, the team responsible for the match not taking place are considered to have forfeited the match and lost 0–3.
If UEFA comes to the conclusion that both or none of the teams are responsible for the match not taking place, the outcome of the match will be decided by drawing of lots, either home win 1–0, home loss 0–1 or draw 0–0, carried out by the UEFA administration.

On 24 September 2020, UEFA announced that five substitutions would be permitted for the remainder of the Women's Euro 2022 qualifying competition, with a sixth allowed in extra time during the play-offs. However, each team is only given three opportunities to make substitutions during matches, with a fourth opportunity in extra time, excluding substitutions made at half-time, before the start of extra time and at half-time in extra time.

Schedule
The qualifying matches are played on dates that fall within the FIFA Women's International Match Calendar. Due to the COVID-19 pandemic, the final tournament was postponed from the summer of 2021 to 2022, and the qualifying round and play-offs were also postponed.

Entrants

Draw
The draw for the qualifying group stage was held on 21 February 2019, 13:30 CET (UTC+1), at the UEFA headquarters in Nyon, Switzerland.

The teams were seeded according to their coefficient ranking, calculated based on the following:
2015 FIFA Women's World Cup final tournament and qualifying competition (20%)
UEFA Women's Euro 2017 final tournament and qualifying competition (40%)
2019 FIFA Women's World Cup qualifying competition (40%)

Each group contained one team from each of Pots 1–5 (two teams from Pot 5 for six-team group). Based on the decisions taken by the UEFA Emergency Panel, Kosovo would not be drawn in the same group as Bosnia and Herzegovina or Serbia.

Notes
Teams marked in bold qualified for the final tournament.

Qualifying group stage

Group A

Group B

Group C

Group D

Group E

Group F

Group G

Group H

Group I

Ranking of second-placed teams
As groups A and B had six teams while the others had five, in order to determine the three best second-placed teams from the qualifying group stage which advance directly to the final tournament, only the results of the second-placed teams against the first, third, fourth and fifth-placed teams in their group are taken into account. As a result, eight matches played by each second-placed team are counted for the purposes of determining the ranking.

Play-offs

Draw

Matches

Qualified teams
The following 16 teams qualified for the final tournament.

1 Bold indicates champions for that year. Italic indicates hosts for that year.

Top goalscorers

References

External links

Women's Euro Matches: 2022 Qualifying, UEFA.com

 
Qualifying
2021
2019 in women's association football
2020 in women's association football
Women's Euro Qualifying
Women's Euro 2022 Qualifying
August 2019 sports events in Europe
September 2019 sports events in Europe
October 2019 sports events in Europe
November 2019 sports events in Europe
March 2020 sports events in Europe
September 2020 sports events in Europe
October 2020 sports events in Europe
November 2020 sports events in Europe
December 2020 sports events in Europe
February 2021 sports events in Europe
April 2021 sports events in Europe
Association football events postponed due to the COVID-19 pandemic